SS City of Midland 41 was a train ferry  serving the ports of Ludington, Michigan, Milwaukee, Wisconsin, Manitowoc, Wisconsin, and Kewaunee, Wisconsin, for the Pere Marquette Railway and its successor, the Chesapeake and Ohio Railway from 1941 until 1988.  The ferry was named after the city of Midland, Michigan.

Railroad car ferry
The vessel was built by Manitowoc Shipbuilding Company in 1940 at a cost of $1.75 million. One of the last coal-burning car ferries on Lake Michigan, she entered service for the Pere Marquette Railway company in March 1941 as the largest Great Lakes ferry.

The City of Midland 41 was unique for car ferries in that she also contained many amenities for the automobile and passenger traffic that crossed the lake in the warmer summer months. She had an extra passenger deck compared to the other ferries of her time, and frequently would run the Ludington–Manitowoc route during the busy summer months, serving as a moving connector of U.S. Highway 10.  Because of her exemplary amenities as well as her size and aesthetic silhouette she was nicknamed the "Queen of the Lakes".

In 1947 the Pere Marquette Railway was acquired and its assets, including the City of Midland 41, merged into the Chesapeake and Ohio Railway (C&O). During the late 1940s through the 1960s the City of Midland 41 experienced the prime years of her career. They were the last two railroad car ferries built on the Great Lakes.

Barge conversion
By the mid-1970s, the C&O was seeking to abandon its car ferry routes.  Many of the older ferries, including the Pere Marquette 21 & 22, were retired and sold for scrap, leaving only the Spartan, Badger, and City of Midland 41 as the last three ferries operating.  In 1979 the Spartan was laid up in Ludington, leaving only two ferries still in operation.

In 1983, the C&O completed the abandonment of its car ferry routes and the three vessels were purchased by Glen Bowden and George Towns, who formed the Michigan-Wisconsin Transportation Company (M-WT).  This venture, while keeping the ferries running, was doomed to fail almost from the start.  Increased labor costs, combined with improved rail and highway routes through Chicago, rendered the ferries obsolete.  In 1987, USCG inspections showed that the boiler mounts on the City of Midland 41 had deteriorated and needed replacement, however these repairs were waived for a year.

Rather than losing the only ferry in service (the Badger had been laid-up in 1984), M-WT opted to refurbish the Badger, and in 1988 the City of Midland 41 made her last voyage in November of that year.  She was laid-up in Ludington's No. 2 slip.  She sat rusting in the harbor for nine years before her fate was decided.

After a 47-year career in which she carried approximately 1 million railroad cars and sailed 3.5 million miles, it was determined that the City of Midland 41 would be converted to a barge. She was towed out of Ludington harbor on 1 October 1997 and had her superstructure reduced on 7 November.

The City of Midland 41 can be seen today as the deck barge Pere Marquette 41, that makes its home port in Ludington, Michigan. The barge is part of an integrated tug/barge pair with the historic tug Undaunted. The tug is almost as old as the ferry, built for the U.S. Navy as ATA 199 in 1944. The tug was renamed Undaunted when it worked for NOAA briefly in 1963 before serving at the U.S. Merchant Marine Academy until 1993. From 1993 until 1998, the tug worked on the Great Lakes as  Krystal K. before being renamed Undaunted and altered for integrated tug work. A man died in an accident on the barge in November 2013.

Sale
In December, 2020, the barge, along with the SS Badger, was sold to Interlake Steamship Company.  The deal also "includes acquisition of ... the SS Spartan, a sister ship to the Badger that's currently not in operation." It was a part of a larger sale of assets.  The “Middleburg Heights, Ohio-based Interlake Holding Co. acquired the assets of Ludington-based Lake Michigan Car Ferry Co., the owner and operator of the S.S. Badger, according to a statement. The deal also included the assets of Ludington-based Pere Marquette Shipping Co., which included the “workhorse” articulated tug-barge Undaunted-Pere Marquette 41.”

See also 
Charles F. Conrad

References

 
 
 

Steamships of the United States
Pere Marquette Railway
Ferries of Michigan
Ferries of Wisconsin
1941 ships
Ships built in Manitowoc, Wisconsin
Chesapeake and Ohio Railway Car Ferries